Pyromaniac is a 2016 Norwegian drama film directed by Erik Skjoldbjærg. It was selected to be screened in the Contemporary World Cinema section at the 2016 Toronto International Film Festival.

Cast
 Per Frisch as Ingemann
 Agnes Kittelsen as Elsa
 Trond Nilssen as Dag
 Liv Bernhoft Osa as Alma
 Henrik Rafaelsen as Lensmann Johansen

References

External links
 

2016 films
2016 drama films
Norwegian drama films
2010s Norwegian-language films
Films directed by Erik Skjoldbjærg